The Backyard Sessions are a series of music performances by American singer Miley Cyrus. The first sessions featured Cyrus performing cover versions of classic songs in an outdoor setting, and were released in 2012. Subsequent sessions have since been released in support of Cyrus' own projects, including the launch of her Happy Hippie Foundation in 2015 and the release of her albums Plastic Hearts (2020) and Endless Summer Vacation (2023).

The Backyard Sessions (2012) 
The first series was released between September and December 2012, and showed Cyrus performing covers of classic songs with her band in an outdoor setting. Performances included "Lilac Wine" by James Shelton, "What Have They Done to My Song Ma" (stylized as "Look What They've Done to My Song Ma") by Melanie Safka, and "Jolene" by Dolly Parton.

List of performances

Happy Hippie Presents Backyard Sessions (2015) 

In 2015, Cyrus released a new set of Backyard Sessions videos to publicize the launch of the Happy Hippie Foundation. On May 6, the first daily video was posted to social media, with Cyrus joined by Joan Jett in covering Jett's 2013 song "Different". In a second video posted later that day, Cyrus covered Dido's "No Freedom", dedicated to Leelah Alcorn, a teenage transgender girl who killed herself by walking out in front of traffic the previous December. Two more videos were posted on May 9, 2015. In the first, Cyrus performed "Androgynous" by The Replacements alongside Jett and Against Me! frontwoman Laura Jane Grace, who came out as transgender in 2012. In the fourth installment of the Happy Hippie Backyards Sessions, Cyrus provided backing vocals for Grace's performance of the Against Me! song "True Trans Soul Rebel".

In videos posted May 12, Cyrus was joined by Melanie Safka for performances of "Peace Will Come (All According to Plan)" and "What Have They Done to My Song Ma," as covered in the original Backyards Sessions videos. On performing with Cyrus, Safka commented that Cyrus showed "only the part she wanted me to see," but added that she was "very accommodating" and "totally real [...] Her heart is really in the music. The true test of character, for me, is if your heart is in the music." Safka credited the videos with an increase in young people at her concerts. Safka also performed a rendition of "Yaw Baby (Break My Heart)" while Cyrus watched in the background.

In a May 15 video, Cyrus was joined by Ariana Grande for a cover of "Don't Dream It's Over" by Crowded House. Cyrus wore a unicorn onesie, while Grande wore a mouse onesie. The pair reprised the performance at the One Love Manchester benefit concert organized by Grande in June 2017.

In two videos posted on May 19, Cyrus performed covers of "Happy Together" by The Turtles, and Paul Simon's "50 Ways to Leave Your Lover". In the final video, released May 23, she sang "Pablow the Blowfish" in memory of her recently deceased pet fish. The song later appeared on Miley Cyrus & Her Dead Petz (2015).

List of performances

MTV Unplugged Presents: Miley Cyrus Backyard Sessions (2020) 

On October 16, 2020, Cyrus premiered a full Backyard Sessions concert on MTV. Her band called themselves "Miley Cyrus and the Social Distancers," and all members except the singers wore masks in performance. On October 17, she posted six concert videos to her YouTube channel. Four were covers: "Gimme More" by Britney Spears, "Communication" by The Cardigans, "Sweet Jane" by the Velvet Underground, and "Just Breathe" by Pearl Jam. She also posted a live version of her song "Midnight Sky" from her album Plastic Hearts and a duet with her sister Noah Cyrus of Noah's song "I Got So High That I Saw Jesus." During the concert, she also performed a cover of Jackson Browne's "These Days," but this was not uploaded to Cyrus's channel in October.

List of performances

Apple Music Backyard Sessions (2020) 
Furthermore, upon the release of her seventh studio album Plastic Hearts, Cyrus also released a second edition of the album onto Apple Music. This edition included four videos for the backyard sessions for a few of the newly released songs, namely "High", "Plastic Hearts", "Golden G String" and "Angels like You".

List of performances

Miley Cyrus – Endless Summer Vacation (Backyard Sessions) (2023)

Miley Cyrus – Endless Summer Vacation (Backyard Sessions) is an American documentary concert special directed by Jacob Bixenman and Brendan Walter, and starring American singer Miley Cyrus, released on Disney+ on March 10, 2023. The documentary is set at a house in Los Angeles, where Cyrus performs eight songs from her eighth studio album Endless Summer Vacation (2023) alongside her single, "The Climb" (2009), while discussing the creative process behind the album. The special serves as a companion piece to the album.

Synopsis
The official synopsis released to Disney+ states "Miley Cyrus takes the stage in this must-see, Disney+ music event, Miley Cyrus – Endless Summer Vacation (Backyard Sessions). For the first time ever, Miley performs songs from her highly anticipated eighth studio album, Endless Summer Vacation, including her hit single "Flowers", seven additional tracks from the album, plus a special performance. The global superstar's cinematic, one-of-a-kind performances are threaded together with exclusive interviews in the famed Los Angeles house where Frank Sinatra once lived, and where Miley shot the celebrated official music video for "Flowers". With this special, Miley opens the door to audiences around the world providing insight into her new album and the person she is today."

Release and promotion
On March 3, 2023, Cyrus announced the television special to promote her eighth studio album, Endless Summer Vacation. The special is executive produced by Cyrus under her production company, Hopetown Entertainment, with Crush Management, and Columbia Records as co-producers.

Set list
 "Jaded"
 "Rose Colored Lenses"
 "Thousand Miles"
 "Wildcard"
 "Island"
 "Wonder Woman" (with Rufus Wainwright on piano)
 "The Climb"
 "River"
 "Flowers"

References 

Works by Miley Cyrus